Monstera pinnatipartita is a species of flowering plant in the genus Monstera native to Central America and the tropical areas of South America. Like the more common Monstera deliciosa the plant has green foliage that becomes highly fenestrated when mature, though both immature and mature leaves are less heart shaped. Its name refers to the deeply split mature leaves that are pinnate.

References

External links 
 Monstera pinnatipartita, The Exotic Rainforest informational site

pinnatipartita
Plants described in 1857